HMS Rosario was an 11-gun  screw sloop of the Royal Navy, launched in 1860 at Deptford Dockyard. She served two commissions, including eight years on the Australia Station during which she fought to reduce illegal kidnappings of South Sea Islanders for the Queensland labour market. She was decommissioned in 1875, finally being sold for breaking nine years later. A team from Rosario played the first ever New Zealand International Rugby Union match against a Wellington side in 1870. She was the fifth Royal Navy ship to bear the name, which was first used for the galleon Del Rosario, captured from the Spanish in 1588.

Design
The Rosario class was designed in 1858 by Issac Watts, the Director of Naval Construction. They were built of wood, were rated for 11 guns and were built with a full ship rig of sails (this was reduced to a barque rig by about 1869). These were the last sloops constructed for the Royal Navy to retain all-wooden construction; their successors, the Amazon class, incorporated iron cross beams.

Propulsion
Rosario was fitted with a Greenock Foundry Company two-cylinder horizontal single-expansion steam engine driving a single screw. With an indicated horsepower of  she was capable of  under steam.

Armament
As designed, ships of the class carried a single slide-mounted 40-pounder Armstrong breech-loading gun, six 32-pounder muzzle-loading smooth-bore guns and four pivot-mounted 20-pounder Armstrong breech loaders.  By 1869 the armament had been reduced to a single  muzzle-loading gun and two 40-pounders.

Construction
Rosario was ordered from Deptford Dockyard on 1 April 1857 and laid down on 13 June 1859.  She was the first of her class to be launched, on 17 October 1860 and she was commissioned under Commander James Stanley Graham on 20 June 1862.

History

First commission (1862–1866)
From June to October 1862 she was employed in fishery protection duties in the North Sea. In October, she was transferred to the North America and West Indies Station, and cases of fever and smallpox were recorded in her in 1864 after visits to Kingston, Jamaica and Fort Monroe in Virginia.  The strained relationship between the Union and Britain during the American Civil War did not prevent visits to American ports, but ships of the North America Station would also have used Bermuda and the Royal Naval Dockyard, Halifax as bases.  The Lyons–Seward Treaty of 1862 allowed for greater co-operation between the US Navy and the Royal Navy in combating slavery, and it is probable that anti-slavery formed part of her employment, particularly in the Caribbean.

In 1866, she was ordered from Quebec to Montreal to provide protection to the harbour during the Fenian Raid of 1866.  Sixteen members of her ship's company were awarded the "Fenian Raid 1866" clasp to the Canada General Service Medal 1866-70, possibly while serving as members of a Naval Brigade.

After four years on the North America and West Indies Station she paid off at Chatham on 13 October 1866.

Second commission (1867–1875)
Rosario recommissioned at Woolwich on 28 September 1867 under her previous captain, Commander Louis Venturne.  Commander George Palmer then took command in October 1867 and under him she sailed for the Australia Station.

On 4 June 1868, officers from HMS Rosario were entertained in Auckland, New Zealand by the Officers of the Royal Irish Regiment (the 18th). On 5 June the ship left Auckland for Tauranga, with the Governor of New Zealand, Sir George F. Bowen on board.

In 1869 Rosario detained the schooner Daphne on suspicion of "blackbirding", or the illegal recruitment (including enslavement) of the indigenous populations of nearby Pacific islands or northern Queensland. Commander Palmer brought charges at the Vice Admiralty Court of New South Wales, but the charges were dismissed by the Chief Justice of New South Wales, Sir Alfred Stephen, on the grounds that the British Slave Trade Act 1839 did not apply to the South Pacific Ocean.

In 1870 a team from Rosario played the first New Zealand International Rugby Union match against a side from Wellington.

In the event Megaera became a total loss at the isolated St Paul Island, and the crews were rescued by HMS Rinaldo and SS Malacca. There were no fatalities, and the new crews eventually reached their intended ships.

Albert Hastings Markham became acting commander of Rosario between 12 October 1871 and 12 February 1872, during the first cruise to the New Hebrides for the suppression of the South Seas labour trade. He published an account of the cruise under the title The cruise of the Rosario amongst the New Hebrides and Santa Cruz Islands, exposing the recent atrocities connected with the kidnapping of natives in the South Seas. The cruise included a visit to the island of Nukapu to inquire into the murder of Bishop Patteson, but little of value was found until they came to the south-east side of the Island, where the bishop had been killed.  In the words of the contemporary newspaper report:

The ill feeling against white men in Nukapu is easily understood; one of the vessels stopped by Rosario during the November 1871 cruise was the brig Carl, which had been the scene of a particularly brutal massacre.  Markham was too late to find any evidence of the murder of up to 50 islanders on board (that came later when one of the crew turned King's evidence), but the activities of the ship in the area explain the aggressive attacks of the local population, and probably also explain the murder of the bishop.  The measures taken by Rosario became the subject of questions in the House of Commons, and Markham's book on the subject may well have been prompted by them. The book itself makes clear that Markham clearly understood the cycle of violence and deplored both the murderous activities of the Blackbirders, and the apparent need for further violence in restoring order.

In April 1872, once again under Commander Challis, she visited Wellington, Otago and Auckland in New Zealand. Her cruise of the later part of the year took her to the Solomon Islands, and was conducted entirely under canvas. After refitting in Sydney, she left on 9 February 1873 to Wellington, Auckland and Picton in New Zealand, returning to Sydney on 18 September 1873. At the end of October, Rosario sailed to Fiji, the Solomon Islands and New Britain, returning freed workers and including the investigation of murders at Port Praslin (New Ireland), arriving back at Sydney on 16 February 1874.

On 13 March 1874, Commander A.E. Dupuis took command and from then until 20 July visited Fiji and Samoa, and from 21 July Rosario sailed on to the Marshall Islands, the Ellice Islands and the Gilbert Islands, collecting evidence and searching for William "Bully" Hayes, who was notorious for his blackbirding activities. Rosario picked up a number of his shipwrecked crew from Kosrae. Hayes was found and questioned by Commander Dupuis, but escaped before being arrested.  In the words of a Petty Officer on board:

His Journal also describes the final activity of the Commission:

Fate
She is listed at Chatham in 1880, and on 31 January 1884 she was sold to Castle for breaking up at Charlton.

Notes

References

 

Rosario-class sloops
1860 ships
Ships built in Deptford
Victorian-era sloops of the United Kingdom